"St. Elmo's Fire (Man in Motion)" is a song by British singer John Parr from the 1985 film St. Elmo's Fire. It hit #1 on the US Billboard Hot 100 chart on 7 September 1985, remaining there for two weeks. It was the main theme for Joel Schumacher's film, and first single from the soundtrack. The song was created and edited within 24 hours.

The record peaked at #6 in the United Kingdom, Parr's home country, and became a #1 hit for him around the world, and provided many awards and a Grammy nomination.

The song did not initially feature on Parr's studio albums, only appearing on the London Records re-release of his self-titled debut album in the United Kingdom.

Members of the bands Toto, REO Speedwagon and Mr. Mister appear on the recording.

Background and writing
David Foster and John Parr were contracted to write a song for the film, but Parr struggled with inspiration for the lyrics. Foster showed Parr a news clip about the Canadian athlete Rick Hansen, who at the time was going around the world in his wheelchair to raise awareness for spinal cord injuries. His journey was called the "Man in Motion Tour". Parr decided to help the campaign by writing words that would fit vaguely with the film, but which directly referenced Hansen's efforts.

Personnel
John Parr – guitar, vocals
David Foster, Steve Porcaro, David Paich – keyboards
Steve Lukather – guitar
Carlos Vega – drums
Jerry Hey – trumpet
Bill Reichenbach Jr. – trombone
David Amato, Richard Page – backing vocals

In popular culture

During the late 1980s and early 1990s, Ford played the song in advertisements for its Mustang Pony car. 
In 2012, John Parr re-recorded the song with new lyrics, dubbed "Tim Tebow's Fire", to honor Tim Tebow of the Denver Broncos. Parr stated to Denver FOX affiliate KDVR, "I was inspired by Tim Tebow so I wanted to modify the lyrics...in his honor of the way that he lives his life as being a great example."

In 2017, it was heard on the short film Deadpool: No Good Deed. and the 2018 animated film Spider-Man: Into the Spider-Verse.

In 2020-21, during Conan's stint at the Largo Theater, the song was part of a running gag, with different lyrics set to the tune of the chorus, while Conan O'Brien looked at a different camera often with a fan blowing wind in his face.

Music video
The music video features all seven of the main cast of the film St. Elmo's Fire looking sadly through the foggy windows of a run-down and fire-damaged version of the St. Elmo's Bar set.  The video was directed by Kort Falkenberg III, who devised the concept with the film's director, Joel Schumacher. The production company only had Parr for a single day before he had to go back to England, so the shoot had to be done in exactly 24 hours.

The Canadian version of the video intersperses images of Rick Hansen's trek with those of the film.

The ending of the video shows Parr singing to each individual cast member from the film before he disappears into the night, and the cast follows him.

Chart performance

Weekly charts

Year-end charts

All-time charts

Release history

References

External links
 "Zizek and the 80s Movie Song" by Graham Wolfe

Film theme songs
1985 singles
Dance-rock songs
John Parr songs
Billboard Hot 100 number-one singles
Cashbox number-one singles
Songs written by David Foster
RPM Top Singles number-one singles
Songs written for films
Songs written by John Parr
1984 songs
RCA Records singles
Atlantic Records singles
Song recordings produced by David Foster